Henri Vandenabeele (born 15 April 2000) is a Belgian cyclist, who currently rides for UCI WorldTeam .

Major results

2017
 8th La Philippe Gilbert juniors
2018
 2nd Overall Ain Bugey Valromey Tour
 7th Bernaudeau Junior
 9th La Route des Géants
2020
 2nd Overall Ronde de l'Isard
1st  Mountains classification
1st  Points classification
1st Stage 2a
 2nd Overall Giro Ciclistico d'Italia
 10th Overall Giro della Friuli Venezia Giulia
1st  Young rider classification
 10th Il Piccolo Lombardia
2021
 3rd Overall Giro Ciclistico d'Italia
2022
 9th Overall Tour of Oman
 10th Overall Tour of Turkey

Grand Tour general classification results timeline

References

External links

2000 births
Living people
Belgian male cyclists
People from Deinze
Cyclists from East Flanders